Manuel Camilo Agustín Vial Formas (March 20, 1804 – February 20, 1882) was a Chilean political figure and conservative politician. He served several times as minister.

Early life and family
He was born in Valparaíso, he was the son of Agustín Vial Santelices and of María del Rosario de Formas y Patiño Sánchez de Morales. After completing his studies, he graduated as a lawyer on July 30, 1835. He married Luisa Carrera Fontecilla and together had one son, Agustín. After her death he married Rafaela de la Lastra Valdivieso, with whom he had eight children.

Career in politics
He became the secretary of the "Congreso de Plenipotenciarios" on September 14, 1830; replacing José Miguel Varas Vallejos. As a leader of the Conservative party, he was elected deputy for Casablanca in 1831.  He became Secretary of the chamber and member of the permanent committee on government and foreign affairs as well as the one on legislative affairs and justice. He was reelected, this time for San Carlos, on 1834, and again for Cauquenes in 1843.

Vial was elected a Senator from 1846 to 1855; and then again from 1864 to his death in 1882.  President Manuel Bulnes named him Minister of the Interior and Foreign Affairs on September 18, 1846; of Finance, on September 2, 1848; of Justice, Cult and Public Education, on 1849. He was also plenipotentiary minister to Peru in 1846. He was also a State Councillor and Supreme Court fiscal. He died in Valparaiso, at the age of 78.

1804 births
1882 deaths
Members of the Senate of Chile
Members of the Chamber of Deputies of Chile
Chilean Ministers of the Interior
Foreign ministers of Chile
Chilean Ministers of Finance
Chilean Ministers of Justice
Ambassadors of Chile to Peru
Chilean people of French descent
People from Valparaíso
Chilean people of Catalan descent